GYKI 52895 is a drug which is a 2,3-benzodiazepine derivative that also shares the 3,4-methylenedioxyphenethylamine pharmacophore. Unlike other similar drugs, GYKI 52895 is a selective dopamine reuptake inhibitor (DARI), which appears to have an atypical mode of action compared to other DARIs. Its DRI activity is shared by numerous addictive drugs including amphetamine and its derivatives (e.g. dextromethamphetamine), cocaine, and methylphenidate and its derivatives (e.g. ethylphenidate). However, dopaminergic drugs are also prone to producing emetic effects such as in the case of apomorphine.

Egis Pharmaceuticals began clinical development of the drug in 1997 for major depressive disorder and Parkinson's disease, but it was discontinued in 2001.

See also 
GYKI 52466, another 2,3-benzodiazepine with other than GABAergic function
Tifluadom
Lufuradom
Benzodiazepine
Substituted methylenedioxyphenethylamine

References 

Dopamine reuptake inhibitors
Anilines
Benzodiazepines
Benzodioxoles
Abandoned drugs